The Pars (Turkish for Anatolian leopard) is an amphibious armoured combat vehicle family with 4x4, 6×6 and 8×8 versions, produced by FNSS Defence Systems of Turkey.

Development
The development of the PARS vehicles commenced in 2002, based on a design by US company GPV (General Purpose Vehicles), and in cooperation with GPV. PARS 4x4 and PARS 6x6 is being proposed for the Turkish Army. PARS 8x8 was first displayed in February 2005 during the IDEX defence equipment exhibition held in Abu Dhabi. GPV offered 2 more technically different vehicles, the 8x8 GPV Colonel and the 10x10 GPV General. Since the first PARS vehicles were shown in 2005 development and further enhancements have been carried out on a continuous basis.

It was demonstrated in the deserts of the UAE in 2008 covering 11,000 km of desert and road trials. Further testing was again carried out in the UAE deserts in 2010.  The PARS 8x8, fitted with a 25mm gun turret, was also successfully tested by another Middle Eastern country in the summer of 2010.

On March 29, 2022, FNSS and Deftech proposed the PARS III 6x6 for Malaysian military service.

Design

The baseline PARS has a hull consisting of a steel armour.

The driver and commander are seated in a cockpit at the front of the vehicle. Each has a single-piece roof hatch that opens to the side. Both have access to flat-panel displays, on which all relevant information is shown. The seating arrangement depends on the role but the troops are normally seated on individual seats down each side of the hull facing inwards. These shock-absorbing seats are fitted with five-point seatbelts as standard. A large ramp fitted at the rear section will be used for entry and exit of troops.

The modular design of the PARS will incorporate external turrets or weapon stations depending on user requirements. It could be a one or two-man turret or a remotely operated weapon station. To allow for PARS to be rapidly reconfigured for different operational roles, all members of the PARS family have removable roofing so that they can be quickly converted for a wide range of specialist roles.

AV8 Gempita

The PARS 8x8 vehicle was examined by the Malaysian Army competing with the Swiss Mowag Piranha and the Finnish Patria AMV for the implementation of technology to the first Malaysian indigenous armoured vehicle. AV8 Gempita was the result of Malaysian-Turkey collaboration in Malaysia's first indigenous armoured vehicle project with the implementation of PARS technology to its new army armoured vehicle.

Operators

Current operators
  - 67 vehicles in both 6x6 & 8x8 configuration. Received from Turkey during the 2019-2020 Tripoli campaign.
  - 172 vehicles in both 6x6 & 8X8 configuration. First delivery on 12 July 2017 and last in August 2020.
  - Undisclosed number on order and in service.
  - 257 vehicles in both 6x6 & 8X8 configuration.

Potential operators

See also

Comparable vehicles

 Stryker
 LAV III/LAV AFV/LAV-25/ASLAV
 K808 Armored Personnel Carrier
 Boxer
 Freccia IFV
 BTR-90
 CM-32
 Type 96 Armored Personnel Carrier
 Type 16 maneuver combat vehicle
 Patria AMV
 BTR-4
 Saur 2
 TATA Kestrel
 VBCI
 KTO Rosomak
 MOWAG Piranha

References

Notes

External links

FNSS wheeled armored combat vehicle(Army recognition)
FNSS Savunma Sistemleri manufacturer and supplier of armoured vehicles (Army recognition)
 FNSS official website

Armoured fighting vehicles of Turkey
Amphibious armoured personnel carriers
Wheeled amphibious armoured fighting vehicles
Pars
Six-wheeled vehicles
Military vehicles introduced in the 2000s
Armoured personnel carriers of the post–Cold War period